South African women's cricket team toured Ireland in August 2016. The tour consisted of four Women's One Day International (ODI) matches and two Women's Twenty20 International (T20I) matches. South Africa won the ODI series 3–1 and drawn the T20I series 1–1. During the tour, Ireland recorded their first wins over South Africa in international cricket (male or female) by winning the 2nd T20I and the 4th ODI.

Squads

WT20I series

1st T20I

2nd T20I

WODI series

1st ODI

2nd ODI

3rd ODI

4th ODI

References

External links
 Series home at ESPN Cricinfo

2016 in Irish cricket
2016 in South African cricket
Ireland
2016 in South African women's sport
Cricket
2016 in women's cricket
International cricket competitions in 2016